Swansong is the fifth studio album by English extreme metal band Carcass. It was released on 10 June 1996 in the UK by Earache Records. It is the only Carcass album to feature guitarist Carlo Regadas. This album was intended to be their major label debut, having been signed by Columbia Records following the success of Heartwork, but disputes with that record company caused them to return to Earache. The album was re-released on 21 July 2008, as a dualdisc including the fifth part of The Pathologist's Report. It was the band's last studio release for over 17 years, until the release of Surgical Steel in 2013, and the last one to feature drummer Ken Owen.

Background
In The Pathologist's Report, drummer Ken Owen states that he considers Swansong the ultimate Carcass album. The band's sense of humour is illustrated with titles such as "Keep on Rotting in the Free World".

The disc art is the "Unfinished Pyramid et al." from the Great Seal of the United States, but it reads "carcass" instead of "annuit coeptis", "somnus pecunia cibus" instead of "novus ordo seclorum" and "MCMXCV" instead of "MDCCLXXVI".

Release
Swansong was released on 10 June 1996 on Earache Records. A limited edition of this album was released as a brain-shaped CD, with a bonus 2-track CD titled Somnus Pecunia Cibus. The reason for the bonus disc was to include "Go to Hell", which wouldn't fit on the brain shaped CD, due to the cutting required for the brain shape.

On 21 July 2008, a twelve-panel digipak version of the album was released, with full artwork and lyrics as well as a limited edition sticker sheet with classic Carcass motifs. The reissue also features the previously Japanese-only bonus track "Death Rider Da" which was made to be used as a jingle on a Japanese critic Masa Ito's radio program  at the time, as well as the fifth and final part of the extensive interview The Pathologist's Report on a dualdisc. Later editions contain the album on a CD and the documentary on a separate DVD, and do not include the sticker sheet.

In November 2013, Earache rereleased Swansong on full dynamic range vinyl in different colours and with limited circulation.

Track listing

Personnel

Carcass
 Jeffrey Walker – bass, vocals
 Carlo Regadas – guitar
 Bill Steer – guitar
 Ken Owen – drums

Technical personnel
 Colin Richardson – production, vocals (13)
 Nick Brine – assistant engineering
 Jim Brumby – assistant engineering
 Gee – painting
 Stephen Harris – engineering
 Barney Herbert – assistant engineering
 Noel Summerville – mastering
 Antz – Design
 Roalba Picerno – band photos

Charts

References 

Carcass (band) albums
1996 albums
Earache Records albums
Death 'n' roll albums